Josephine (Josie) Bond Hebron (November 22, 1894 – February 1982) was an avid traveler, businesswoman, and writer/publisher who was African-American. She was the cousin of composer and pianist Carl Rossini Diton and sister of  composer and pianist John Harvey Hebron, Marian Anderson’s accompanist and piano teacher.

After starting a funeral home in Philadelphia with her husband, Paul Farwell Keene Sr., Hebron co-founded the National Association of Negro Business and Professional Women's Clubs, Incorporated (NANBPWC, Inc.). In July 1935, Ollie Chinn Porter, President of the New York Club, extended an invitation to local clubs, organized as Business and Professional Women's Clubs, to join and form a national organization. The Founders were Emma Odessa Young, Ollie Chinn Porter, and Effie Diton of New York City; Bertha Perry Rhodes, Josephine B. Keene, and Adelaide Flemming of Philadelphia; and Pearl Flippen of Atlantic City.

In 1939, Josephine authored and published the Directory of Negro business and professional women of Philadelphia and vicinity. Josephine loved to travel visiting many places, including the West Indies as well as Europe.  Josephine and Paul had two boys and two girls, including renowned artist Paul F. Keene Jr.

References

African-American publishers (people)
American publishers (people)
African-American writers
American writers
1894 births
1982 deaths
20th-century African-American people
African-American women writers